The Keystone Community Church, on McGinley St. in Keystone, Nebraska, was built in 1908.  It was listed on the National Register of Historic Places in 1979.

It is a one-story board and batten building just  in plan. It has also been known as The Little Church.

References

Churches in Nebraska
National Register of Historic Places in Keith County, Nebraska
Churches completed in 1908